Turtle Trek is a 3D dome film projection theater located at SeaWorld Orlando in the United States. It was designed by Falcon's Treehouse and PGAV Destinations.

Summary
Guests first visit two naturalistic habitats, one filled with West Indian manatees and several species of freshwater fish, the other home to more than 1,500 saltwater fish  and over a dozen sea turtles. Many of the manatees and sea turtles were rescued by the park's animal team or were born at SeaWorld.

Moving on from the habitat, guests enter a domed theater. Turtle Trek's theater is the world's first 360 degree dome theater to show a 3D film. The theater uses 34 projectors to seamlessly cover the entire surface of the dome, allowing the movie to be shown all around guests and even above them. Turtle Trek tells the story of a sea turtle's journey through life, from birth to adulthood. Guests are given a turtle's perspective of the ocean's wonders.

Turtle Trek is meant to inspire guests to help conserve natural environments. "Do a little, do a lot, but join us and do something to help the world and its animals," said Brian Morrow, the attraction's chief designer, regarding the attraction's message. "Turtle Trek is about the everyday heroes who can make a difference in nature."

After exiting the theater, the path would lead guests to the end of the experience where they would view the habitats from the surface. An exhibit for juvenile American alligators is located beside the attraction.

History

On May 31, 1993, Manatees: The Last Generation? opened. The attraction contains 300,000 gallons of water in a 3-1⁄2 acre lagoon that contains manatees. The lagoon also contained birds, turtles, and fishes native to the state of Florida. It used film, graphics and hands-on displays to help visitors learn about manatees.

Around 2006 and 2007, the attraction's name changed its name to Manatee Rescue. In November 2011, Turtle Trek was announced and will be located by the manatee facility. By December 2011 and January 2012, the exhibit closed for a renovation. The sea turtles were moved from the nearby Turtle Point (now Pelican Preserve) and the lagoon was separated into two exhibits for each of these creatures.

The exhibit reopened as Turtle Trek on April 27, 2012, in the Key West (now called the Sea of Shallows) section of the park. The state-of-the-art attraction included original music and a CGI dome film, where guests could view 360 degrees around to view the film.

On March 30, 2016, the park began to allow visitors to visit the park's Manatee Rehab Center located at the exit.

Because of its location in the park, while Turtle Trek was incredibly popular at the beginning, the location is mostly empty now. The attraction initially opened with multiple 'holding rooms' that were supervised by staff, at each of the individual tanks. Once going through all the holding rooms, guests would file into a theatre with 3D glasses for the show to begin. Because of the lack of crowds in this area, the holding rooms are no longer in use (along with the preshow videos), rather guests can walk freely from the tanks and to the film, which now plays constantly.

Because of the COVID-19 pandemic, the 3D glasses used for the film were removed, and the film was updated to be viewable in 2D.

In late 2022, after being shuttered since the reopening in 2020, the attraction's facade was dismantled, the entrance was blocked off, and SeaWorld quietly removed Turtle Trek from its animal experiences page on their website, which seemed to seal the attraction's fate.

During the Inside Look event in 2023, TurtleTrek seemed to reopen quietly as the SeaWorld Rescue Center, sporting an updated interior and exterior presentation. It is unknown as of January 2023 if this will be exclusive to the Inside Look events, or if it will be a permanent addition for the years to come.

See also

 SeaWorld
 SeaWorld Orlando
 Turtle Talk with Crush, a Walt Disney World attraction

References

External links
 Website
 Falcon's Treehouse, LLC

Oceanaria in the United States
Amusement rides introduced in 2012
SeaWorld Orlando
Amusement rides manufactured by Falcon's Treehouse
2012 establishments in Florida